A simpleton is a stock character in folklore who lacks common sense.

Simpleton may also refer to:

 Simpleton (reggae musician) (1971–2004), Jamaican reggae artist
 The Simpleton, the 1850 debut novel of Alexei Pisemsky
 The Simpletons, shortened original title of Jude the Obscure
 The Simpleton (Messerschmidt), a sculpture by Franz Xaver Messerschmidt

See also 
 "Mayor of Simpleton", a 1989 song by British New Wave band XTC
 The Pretended Simpleton, Mozart opera